The Good Counsel College (abbreviated as GCC) is an independent Roman Catholic co-educational secondary day school, located in Innisfail, Queensland, Australia. It is a diocese school administered by the Diocese of Cairns. The school serves Innisfail and South Johnstone / Mourilyan and Innisfail's outlying regional areas, generally extending north to Babinda, south to Tully and Mission Beach and inland to Millaa Millaa.

History

Good Counsel College was established in 1975 as a result of the joining of two separate single sex education institutes: The Sacred Heart Girls School conducted by the Sisters of the Good Samaritan and the Marist Brothers' Boys' School.  Initially the school was organized catering only to students in years 8, 9 and 10. However under guidance from the school's first lay principal Peter Albion the school was quickly established as an academic institute offering a full secondary education.

In recent years the school has undergone significant expansion both in terms of enrolments and infrastructure, having trebled the number of enrolments since its inception in 1975.

House system
As is common in Australian secondary schools, students at Good Counsel  during interhouse sporting carnivals are split up into four houses, they are Polding (blue) Marcellin (red), MacKillop (purple) and Clancy (Green), but are also commonly used to group students at assemblies and especially during mass transport to event destinations. Each house has an elected male and female captain, who are responsible for aspects of school carnival preparation.

School song
The College's song is One Spirit in Christ.

See also

 Catholic Education Cairns
 Catholic education in Australia
 List of schools in Queensland

References

External links
http://www.gcc.qld.edu.au Good Counsel College Website

Educational institutions established in 1975
Schools in Far North Queensland
Catholic secondary schools in Queensland
Buildings and structures in Innisfail, Queensland
1975 establishments in Australia
Roman Catholic Diocese of Cairns